Skandos was a town of ancient Cappadocia, inhabited in Byzantine times. 

Its site is located near Talas, Asiatic Turkey.

References

Populated places in ancient Cappadocia
Former populated places in Turkey
Populated places of the Byzantine Empire
History of Kayseri Province